Arco de la Victoria is a triumphal arch built in the Moncloa district of Madrid, Spain. The 49 m high arch was constructed at the behest of Francisco Franco to commemorate the victory of Francoist troops in the 1936 Battle of Ciudad Universitaria, part of the Spanish Civil War.

See also
 List of post-Roman triumphal arches
Fascist architecture
Nazi architecture

References

Buildings and structures in Ciudad Universitaria neighborhood, Madrid
Triumphal arches in Spain
Monuments and memorials in Madrid
Francoist monuments and memorials in Spain